The 53 Division is an elite division of the Sri Lanka Army. Trained and formed in 1996 under the leadership of US military officers, the unit was used as a principal offensive division during the War, having been deployed for combat operations in the Jaffna Peninsula, and is under the command of Security Forces Headquarters - Jaffna. 98% of the soldiers were “regulars”, meaning previous generations of their families had served or were serving in the military. The brigades of the 53 Division are also trained by the US Special Forces, which have been closely involved with its development and training since 1997. The 53 division consists of the Airmobile Brigade, a Mechanised Infantry Brigade and a Special Forces Brigade. At present, it is headquartered at Inamaluwa, Dambulla and serves as one of two infantry divisions in the Reserve Strike Force (RSF) under the direct command of the I Corps capable of acting as a rapid reaction force.

Current formation
Air Mobile Brigade
53-2 Brigade
53-3 Brigade

Sri Lankan Civil War

Towns captured by 53 Division

Notable members
Major General Janaka Perera
Major General Kamal Gunaratne
Major General Samantha Sooriyabandara

References

Sri Lanka Army divisions